The Albany thickets is an ecoregion of dense woodland in southern South Africa, which is concentrated around the Albany region of the Eastern Cape (whence the region's name originates).

Geography
The thickets grow on well-drained sandy soils in the wide valleys of the Great Fish, Sundays and Gamtoos River in the Eastern Cape and, extending further northwest, in the valleys of the Cape Fold Belt. Thicket is vulnerable to fire and to grazing so has always been restricted to valley areas where these are less of a threat than on open plains.

Climate
The climate is dry, especially as one proceeds inland, but the shady valleys are cooler than the surrounding terrain which is hot in summer, cold in winter and receives irregular rainfall.

Flora

The thickets contain many endemic plants, in particular succulent Euphorbia species and can be divided into three sections of varying habitat. The thicket is richest and most dense in the river valleys near the coast where it contains thorny shrubs with an undergrowth of creepers and succulent plants. As the river valleys climb inland and upstream the climate is drier and the vegetation less dense. Finally the shrubland in mountain valleys to the northwest consists of predominantly the porkbush (Portulacaria afra) and jade plant (Crassula ovata) succulents, along with boxthorn (Lycium austrinum), jacketplum (Pappea capensis), Euclea undulata, Rhigozum obovatum, aloes and Schotia afra. Along with the fynbos ecoregions the Albany thickets comprise the Cape Floristic Region.

Fauna
Birds in this area include black goshawk, black-headed oriole and two species which are almost endemic to the Cape area, the orange-breasted sunbird and Cape siskin. There is one near-endemic mammal Duthie's golden mole (Chlorotalpat duthieae) and in the inland valleys, Addo Elephant National Park is home to African bush elephant (Loxodonta africana), black rhinoceros (Diceros bicornis) and antelopes such as bushbuck (Tragelaphus scriptus), grey rhebok (Pelea capreolus), mountain reedbuck (Redunca fulvorufula), common eland (Taurotragus oryx), greater kudu (Tragelaphus strepsiceros), red hartebeest (Alcelaphus buselaphus), Cape grysbok (Raphicerus melanotis) and common duiker (Sylvicapra grimmia).

Threats and preservation
A large part of the region has been converted for agriculture or reduced by grazing, especially by goats. This is a continuous threat especially in the river valleys near the coast, which are also vulnerable to clearance for urban areas and tourist resorts. Protected areas include Addo Elephant National Park near Port Elizabeth, the Groendal Wilderness Area near Uitenhage on the Swartkops River, and the Baviaanskloof Mega Reserve.

See also

References

External links

 
Afrotropical ecoregions
Ecoregions of South Africa
Mediterranean forests, woodlands, and scrub
Sclerophyll forests